The 1974 FIBA World Championship was the 7th FIBA World Championship, the international basketball world championship for men's teams. It was hosted by Puerto Rico from July 3 to 14, 1974. The tournament was won by the Soviet Union.

Venues

Competing nations

Preliminary round

Group A

Group B

Group C

Classification round

Final round

Awards

Final rankings

All-Tournament Team

  Alexander Belov
  Vinko Jelovac
  Wayne Brabender
  Alejandro Urgelles
  Alexander Salnikov

Top scorers (ppg)

 Arturo Guerrero (Mexico) 27.0
 Manuel Raga (Mexico) 26.1
 Eddie Palubinskas (Australia) 24.8
 Wayne Brabender (Spain) 23.0
 Ernesto Gehrmann (Argentina) 22.3
 Luther Burden (United States) 20.2
 John Lucas (United States) 20.2
 Dragan Kićanović (Yugoslavia) 19.8
 Alejandro Urgelles (Cuba) 19.3
 William Adornado (Philippines) 18.0

References

External links
 
 

1974
1974 in basketball
1974 in Puerto Rican sports
International basketball competitions hosted by Puerto Rico